The Wainui River is a river of the Northland Region of New Zealand's North Island. It flows generally northeast from its sources at the eastern end of the Maungataniwha Range to reach the Oruaiti River five kilometres southwest of the Whangaroa Harbour.

See also
List of rivers of New Zealand

References

Rivers of the Northland Region
Rivers of New Zealand